Ramjee Chandran is a journalist and author. Chandran has been the Editor of Explocity a fortnightly magazine since 1998.
According to The Daily Telegraph, Explocity is partly owned by Rupert Murdoch. He is also the host of the podcast, The Literary City With Ramjee Chandran.

Career

Ramjee Chandran launched several magazines devoted to the city of Bangalore, India, notably The Bangalore Monthly and Bangalore Weekly.
Also Chandran wrote several columns for various newspapers and magazines. Prior to the inception of Explocity, Chandran first began a Bangalore-based magazine, "Bangalore This Fortnight", in 1989. This was followed by the launch of the Bangalore Monthly and the Bangaloremag.com. The internet had just begun its journey in the late 1990s in India, when Chandran created Explocity.com in 1999. Some of the initial funding was from  Rupert Murdoch's News Corp. Explocity has content includes events, restaurants, hotel listings, shopping, nightlife and sightseeing in cities like New York City, Dubai, and Indian cities.

Chandran is also a jazz guitarist and has performed with other acclaimed musicians on stage.

Ramjee Chandran was featured in the New York podcast Destination On The Left as a media expert.

Chandran was invited by Bangalore International Centre to moderate a panel comprising leading animal activists and representatives from the Bangalore city corporation.

Ramjee Chandran started The Literary City with Ramjee Chandran, under Explocity Podcasts in 2022.

Awards and honors
 Chanakya Award for Innovative Leadership
 Best entrepreneurs from Karnataka, India

References

Indian male journalists
Indian newspaper editors
Writers from Bangalore
Living people
Indian columnists
Year of birth missing (living people)